Carmel Pinnacles State Marine Reserve (SMR) is a marine protected area in Carmel Bay including a unique underwater pinnacle formation with adjacent kelp forest, submarine canyon head, and surfgrass.  Carmel Bay is adjacent to the city of Carmel-by-the-Sea and is near Monterey, on California's central coast.

History
Carmel Pinnacles SMR was established in September 2007 by the California Department of Fish & Game. It was one of 29 marine protected areas adopted during the first phase of the Marine Life Protection Act Initiative.  The Marine Life Protection Act Initiative (or MLPAI) is a collaborative public process to create a statewide network of marine protected areas along the California coastline.

This marine protected area covers .53 square miles bounded by the mean high tide line and straight lines connecting the following points in the order listed:
 36° 33.65’ N. lat. 121° 57.60’ W. long.;
 36° 33.65’ N. lat. 121° 58.50’ W. long.;
 36° 33.10’ N. lat. 121° 58.50’ W. long.;
 36° 33.10’ N. lat. 121° 57.60’ W. long.; and
 36° 33.65’ N. lat. 121° 57.60’ W. long.

Scientific monitoring
As specified by the Marine Life Protection Act, select marine protected areas along California's central coast are being monitored by scientists to track their effectiveness and learn more about ocean health. Similar studies in marine protected areas located off of the Santa Barbara Channel Islands have already detected gradual improvements in fish size and number.  The SMR protects all marine life within its boundaries.  Fishing and take of all living marine resources is prohibited.

Local scientific and educational institutions involved in the monitoring include Stanford University's Hopkins Marine Station, University of California Santa Cruz, Moss Landing Marine Laboratories and Cal Poly San Luis Obispo. Research methods include hook-and-line sampling, intertidal and scuba diver surveys, and the use of Remote Operated Vehicle (ROV) submarines.

Recreation and nearby attractions
The reserve is near Carmel Bay State Marine Conservation Area, Point Lobos State Marine Reserve and Point Lobos State Marine Conservation Area.  Carmel Bay is an unsurpassed ocean recreational playground serving as a destination for divers and kayakers attracted to its unique pinnacle formations, granite reefs and kelp forests.  Carmel-by-the-Sea is known for its beautiful white sand beach.

In nearby Monterey, the Monterey Bay Aquarium is a major tourist attraction featuring a  living kelp forest. The exhibit includes many of the species native to the nearby marine protected areas. The aquarium also houses sea otters, intertidal wildlife, and occasionally sea turtles.

California's marine protected areas encourage recreational and educational uses of the ocean. Activities such as kayaking, diving, snorkeling, and swimming are allowed unless otherwise restricted.

References

External links
California's MPAs
Marine Life Protection Act Initiative
CalOceans
Carmel-By-The-Sea
Monterey Bay Aquarium

Marine sanctuaries in California
Carmel-by-the-Sea, California
California Department of Fish and Wildlife areas
California State Reserves
Protected areas of Monterey County, California